Hill House, also known as the Col. James Johnston House, is an historic home which is located in Boalsburg, Harris Township, Centre County, Pennsylvania. 

It was added to the National Register of Historic Places in 1977.

History and architectural features 
Built sometime around 1830, Hill House is a two-and-one-half-story, five-bay, stone dwelling with a gable roof, attic, and basement, which measures . It has a stone and frame rear kitchen ell that measures , and was built by Col. James Johnston, one of the principal figures in the growth of the town of Boalsburg.

It was added to the National Register of Historic Places in 1977.

References

Houses on the National Register of Historic Places in Pennsylvania
Houses completed in 1830
Houses in Centre County, Pennsylvania
1830 establishments in Pennsylvania
National Register of Historic Places in Centre County, Pennsylvania